Hexapora is a monotypic genus in the family Lauraceae. It has the single species Hexapora curtisii. The genus is named for the anther pores of the tree's six stamens. The species is named for the English botanist Charles Curtis, who collected samples of the species for Joseph Dalton Hooker.

Description
Its inflorescences feature small yellow flowers, which bloom from March to December.

Distribution and habitat
Hexapora curtisii is endemic to Peninsular Malaysia, where it is confined to Penang Island.

Conservation
Hexapora curtisii was assessed in 1998 as Critically Endangered on the IUCN Red List. While a 2015 search did not locate the species, its forest habitat is intact and protected.

References

Lauraceae genera
Monotypic Laurales genera
Taxonomy articles created by Polbot
Flora of Peninsular Malaysia
Lauraceae